In mathematics, basic hypergeometric series, or q-hypergeometric series, are q-analogue generalizations of generalized hypergeometric series, and are in turn generalized by elliptic hypergeometric series.  
A series xn is called hypergeometric if the ratio of successive terms xn+1/xn is a rational function of n.  If the ratio of successive terms is a rational function of qn, then the series is called a basic hypergeometric series. The number q is called the base. 

It becomes the hypergeometric series  in the limit when base .

Definition
There are two forms of basic hypergeometric series,  the unilateral basic hypergeometric series φ, and the more general bilateral basic hypergeometric series ψ.
The unilateral basic hypergeometric series is defined as

where 

and 

is the q-shifted factorial.
The most important special case is when j = k + 1, when it becomes

This series is called balanced if a1 ... ak + 1 = b1 ...bkq.
This series is called well poised if a1q = a2b1 = ... = ak + 1bk, and very well poised if in addition  a2 = −a3 = qa11/2. 
The unilateral basic hypergeometric series is a q-analog of the hypergeometric series since

holds.
The bilateral basic hypergeometric series, corresponding to the bilateral hypergeometric series, is defined as

The most important special case is when j = k, when it becomes

The unilateral series can be obtained as a special case of the bilateral one by setting one of the b variables equal to q, at least when none of the a variables is a power of q, as all the terms with n < 0 then vanish.

Simple series
Some simple series expressions include

and 

and

The q-binomial theorem
The q-binomial theorem (first published in 1811 by Heinrich August Rothe) states that

which follows by repeatedly applying the identity

The special case of a = 0 is closely related to the q-exponential.

Cauchy binomial theorem
Cauchy binomial theorem is a special case of the q-binomial theorem.

Ramanujan's identity
Srinivasa Ramanujan gave the identity

valid for |q| < 1 and |b/a| < |z| < 1. Similar identities for  have been given by Bailey. Such identities can be understood to be generalizations of the Jacobi triple product theorem, which can be written using q-series as

Ken Ono gives a related formal power series

Watson's contour integral
As an analogue of the Barnes integral for the hypergeometric series, Watson showed that

where the poles of  lie to the left of the contour and the remaining poles lie to the right. There is a similar contour integral for  r+1φr. This contour integral gives an analytic continuation of the basic hypergeometric function in z.

Matrix version
The basic hypergeometric matrix function can be defined as follows:

The ratio test shows that this matrix function is absolutely convergent.

See also
Dixon's identity
Rogers–Ramanujan identities

Notes

External links
 Wolfram Mathworld – q-Hypergeometric Functions.

References

 W.N. Bailey, Generalized Hypergeometric Series, (1935) Cambridge Tracts in Mathematics and Mathematical Physics, No.32, Cambridge University Press, Cambridge.
 William Y. C. Chen and Amy Fu, Semi-Finite Forms of Bilateral Basic Hypergeometric Series (2004)
 Exton, H. (1983), q-Hypergeometric Functions and Applications, New York:  Halstead Press, Chichester: Ellis Horwood, 
 Sylvie Corteel and Jeremy Lovejoy,  Frobenius Partitions and the Combinatorics of Ramanujan's  Summation

Victor Kac, Pokman Cheung, Quantum calculus,  Universitext, Springer-Verlag, 2002. 
 . Section 0.2
 Andrews, G. E., Askey, R. and Roy, R. (1999). Special Functions, Encyclopedia of Mathematics and its Applications, volume 71, Cambridge University Press.
 Eduard Heine, Theorie der Kugelfunctionen, (1878) 1, pp 97–125.
 Eduard Heine, Handbuch die Kugelfunctionen. Theorie und Anwendung'' (1898) Springer, Berlin.

Q-analogs
Hypergeometric functions